The Bombardment of Fort Stevens occurred in June 1942, in the American Theater and the Pacific Theater of World War II. The Imperial Japanese submarine I-25 fired on Fort Stevens, which defended the Oregon side of the Columbia River's Pacific entrance.

Bombardment
The Imperial Japanese Navy submarine , commanded by Akiji Tagami, had been assigned to sink enemy shipping and attack the enemy on land with its 14 cm deck gun. Transporting a Yokosuka E14Y seaplane, the submarine was manned by a crew of 97. On 21 June 1942, I-25 had entered U.S. coastal waters, following fishing boats to avoid the mine fields in the area.

Late that night, Commander Tagami ordered his crew to surface his submarine at the mouth of the Columbia River. His target was Fort Stevens, which dated to the American Civil War and was armed with more or less obsolete Endicott era artillery, including  mortars and several  and  disappearing guns.

Tagami ordered the deck gun crew to open fire on Fort Stevens' Battery Russell. Surprisingly, his shots were harmless, in part because the fort's commander ordered an immediate blackout. The commander also refused to permit his men to return fire, which would have revealed their position. Spotting the enemy gun flashes with a depression position finder indicated the submarine was out of range.

Most Japanese rounds landed in a nearby baseball field or a swamp, although one landed close to Battery Russell and another next to a concrete pillbox. One round damaged several large telephone cables, the only real damage that Tagami caused. A total of seventeen explosive shells were fired at the fort.

United States Army Air Forces planes on a training mission spotted the I-25 and called in her location for an A-29 Hudson bomber to attack. The bomber found the target, but the I-25 successfully dodged the falling bombs and submerged undamaged.

Aftermath

Even though there were no injuries and very little damage, the Japanese attack on Fort Stevens along with the Aleutian Islands Campaign the same month helped create the 1942 full-scale West Coast invasion scare. Thereafter, rolls of barbed wire would be strung from Point Adams, near the mouth of the Columbia River, southward in case of an invasion. The wrecked British barque Peter Iredale was entangled in the wire and would remain so until the war's end.

The Fort Stevens shelling marked the only time that a military base in the contiguous United States was attacked by the Axis Powers during World War II, and was the second time a continental U.S. military base was attacked by an enemy since the bombing of Dutch Harbor two weeks earlier.

See also
 World War I Bombardment of Madras
 World War I Bombardment of Orleans
 World War II German attacks on Nauru
 World War II Bombardment of Ellwood
 World War II "Battle of Los Angeles"

References

Notes

Bibliography

 
 
 Aviation History article
 Fort Stevens, The Coast Defense Study Group, Inc. Retrieved 2019-05-15.
 Fort Stevens State Park, Oregon Parks and Recreation Department. Retrieved 2019-05-15.
 IJN I-25: Tabular Record of Movement

Conflicts in 1942
Naval battles of World War II involving Japan
Naval battles of World War II involving the United States
Clatsop County, Oregon
History of Oregon
Fort Stevens
American Theater of World War II
Battles and conflicts without fatalities
1942 in Oregon
June 1942 events
Attacks on military installations in the 1940s